Mipham may refer to:

Jamgon Ju Mipham Gyatso (1846–1912), famous Rime and Nyingma scholar and author
Mipham Chokyi Lodro (1952–2014), 14th Shamar Rinpoche
Sakyong Mipham (born 1962)
Pang Mipham Gonpo (spangs mi pham mgon po) - disciple of Vairotsana 
Gyalwang Mipham Wangpo (1654–1717), 4th Gyalwang Drukchen
Mipham Chökyi Nangwa (1768–1822), 8th Gyalwang Drukchen
Mipham Chökyi Gyatsho (1823–1883), 9th Gyalwang Drukchen
Mipham Chökyi Wangpo (1884–1930), see Gyalwang Drukpa